Raymond Peter Kogovsek (August 19, 1941 – April 30, 2017) was an U.S. Representative from Colorado for three terms from 1979 to 1985.

Early life and education
Born in Pueblo, Colorado, Kogovsek graduated from Pueblo Catholic High School, 1959. He attended Pueblo Junior College, Pueblo, Colorado from 1960 to 1962. Kogovsek received his Bachelor of Science degree from Adams State College, Alamosa, Colorado, 1964. He then did graduate work, at University of Denver, 1965.

Political career
He served in the Pueblo County Clerk office from 1964 to 1973. He worked as a paralegal aide from 1974 to 1978.

Kogovsek served in the Colorado House of Representatives from 1969 to 1971. He then served in the Colorado Senate from 1971 to 1978.
He served as a delegate, Colorado State Democratic conventions from 1966 to 1979.

Congress
Kogovsek was elected as a Democrat to the Ninety-sixth and to the two succeeding Congresses (January 3, 1979 – January 3, 1985).
He did not seek reelection to the Ninety-ninth Congress.
He was a resident of Pueblo, Colorado.

Death
Kogovsek died on April 30, 2017.

References

External links

 

1941 births
2017 deaths
American people of Slovenian descent
Democratic Party members of the United States House of Representatives from Colorado
People from Pueblo, Colorado
Adams State University alumni
University of Denver alumni
Democratic Party members of the Colorado House of Representatives
Democratic Party Colorado state senators